Ugandan Americans are Americans of Ugandan descent. The survey of 2014 counted 20,248 Ugandan Americans in the United States.

History

In the 1960s, many Ugandans immigrated to places such as Chicago, many of them to study at selected universities. In 1975, 859 Ugandans emigrated, most fleeing Idi Amin's regime. They were mostly of Indian descent, whose families had lived in Uganda for several generations.  Many Ugandan emigrants were seminarians and clerics, who settled in places such as Chicago to study theology and later become pastors for African congregations.

In the 1980s, there was a steady and gradual growth in number of Ugandans in North America, particularly in the US, where some immigrated via the DV - lottery system. However, Ugandan immigration fell to less than 150 each year in the late 1980s and early 1990s, a time of political stability in Uganda.

Although the reasons as to why people migrate have evolved, more recently, due to the political economy, the benefit thereof to today's Uganda, is indisputable.

Few Ugandan refugees obtained permanent residency status in the US, viz from 1946 to 1996, fewer than 50 people. However, in 1993 and 1994, 87 people and 79 people obtained US permanent residency status respectively.

Demography
The largest Ugandan communities are in California, Maryland, Massachusetts, Texas, and Illinois. In Los Angeles, California Ugandans tend to concentrate in the San Fernando Valley.

Most Ugandans who emigrate go to the  United States, the United Kingdom and Canada. The reasons for migration is based on the low economic remuneration for workers in Uganda and the low political stability of the country compared with the west. Also, many Ugandans immigrated to pursue better educational opportunities. However, although many Ugandans who immigrate to United States are of indigenous Ugandan origin, many Ugandans are of Asian origin (usually Indians, Pakistani, and Konkani of Goa) and some of mixed descent. In the US census, Ugandans of non-indigenous descent  are counted in a separate category other than that of indigenous Ugandans. With the institution of a growing so called "multi-racial tribe" that was formally recognized by the government in 2016, the effects of net immigration might change as more multi-racial Ugandans are recognized as citizens, either through birth or naturalization.

Most people who immigrate come from cities, especially Kampala, and rural emigration is low. Ugandans who want to work in rural areas or in public practice do not usually migrate.

Many Ugandans in United States are medical, legal, computer scientists, workers or engage in civil service, work in blue-collar jobs or religious professions.

Many Ugandan nurses immigrate to the United States and Canada, and formerly to the UK, due to high rates of pay. Due to emigration for financial benefit there are few nurses in Uganda and 70% of them want to emigrate. The U.S. is perceived to have better pay and less competition to enter the country. Most students who migrate learned about opportunities for the emigration of their friends and colleagues who had already emigrated, because information on migration in Uganda, isn't very accessible.

According to the Migration Policy Institute, the total number of immigrants in the USA from Uganda estimated for 2015 to 2019 was 31,400, the state with the largest number being Massachusetts with 5,200 people. Nationally, the top counties of settlement were as follows:

1) Middlesex County, Mass. ------------------- 3,400

2) Los Angeles County, CA -------------------- 1,500

3) Montgomery County, MD ------------------ 1,100

Assimilation 
Some newly arrived Ugandans receive assistance from Catholic Social Services and other humanitarian relief agencies. Because English is Uganda's official language, many Ugandan Americans do not face significant language barriers (although also is significative the use of Luganda Ugandan language in the community).

Recent statistics indicate that these Ugandans have become the country's biggest contributors to the economy, amounting to US$1 billion in annual remittances. North America has become home to many Ugandans. The Ugandans accomplished the goals that brought them to the US or Canada. This has prompted them to forge solidities, associations, clubs and brotherhood to foster unity and maintain connectivity to their motherland. The solidarities are based on cultural/ethnic backgrounds, with UNAA as the umbrella association that houses all Ugandans regardless their background, creed, tribe and/or social status. On the month of August have place three major events that bring together the Ugandans in North America in rather spectacular flair. These festivities include the Ttabamiruka, the International Community of Banyakigezi and the Uganda North American Association convention.

The Uganda North American Association (UNAA) is the oldest and largest of the Ugandan American organizations, holding an Annual Convention and Trade Expo each labor day weekend in different North American cities. The 27th Annual UNAA Convention and Trade Expo is  held in New Orleans, LA. UNAA serves as the umbrella association that houses all Ugandans regardless their background, creed, tribe and/or social status tracing its origins to the Thanksgiving weekend of 1988 in the suburbs of Atlanta, GA.

Ugandan Americans tend to establish single-family homes where children learn reverence for God and their family. The choice of a marriage partners is up to the individual. Ugandan immigrants take part in community and school events in much the same way as other Americans.

Most Ugandan Americans are Christians, as about two-thirds of Uganda's population is Christian, being Catholics (who make up the 60% of the Chicago's Ugandans) and Protestants (Episcopalians, Lutherans, and Evangelicals, at least). The remaining third practice indigenous religions or follow Islam.

Ugandan communities from places such as Chicago celebrate weddings and funerals together, as well as the June 3 Ugandan Saints' (or Martyrs') Day.

Politics and government
Many Ugandan Americans have joined to several Africans organizations with political objectives such as the National Summit on Africa to encourage the US Government to develop policies that help Uganda.

Notable people
Ntare Mwine, stage and film actor, playwright, photographer and documentarian
Mathias Kiwanuka, former American football defensive end
Patrick Ssenjovu, film and theatre actor
Zohran Kwame Mamdani, member-elect of the New York State Assembly, Ugandan of Indian origin.
Rajat Neogy, founder of Transition Magazine, a Ugandan of Indian Bengali origin. He spent his last 20 years in USA.
Ivan Edwards (physician), specialist, ex-minister, USAF Reserve flight surgeon, community activist, speaker, CEO.
Tanoh Kpassagnon, current American football defensive end for the Kansas City Chiefs.
Mario Judah, rapper, record producer, singer and songwriter.

See also

 Uganda–United States relations
Southeast Africans in the United States

References

Further reading
 Conrad, N. L. “The Effect of Character and Values on Ugandan Adaptation to America.” Journal of Cultural Diversity 16#3 (2009): 99–108.
 Crandall, Rick, and Richard W. Thompson. "The social meaning of leisure in Uganda and America." Journal of Cross-Cultural Psychology 9.4 (1978): 469–481.
 Miller, Olivia. "Ugandan Americans." Gale Encyclopedia of Multicultural America, edited by Thomas Riggs, (3rd ed., vol. 4, Gale, 2014), pp. 449–458. online
 Muwanguzi, Samuel, and George W. Musambira. "Communication experiences of Ugandan immigrants during acculturation to the United States." Journal of Intercultural Communication 30.6 (2012): 639–659. online

External links
 Poverty and Migration: The Ugandan Experience
 "The Phenomenon of Forced Migration in Uganda", Refugee Law Project, Retrieved July 13, 2010.

American people of Ugandan descent
Southeast Africans in the United States